Omagh is a 2004 film dramatising the events surrounding the Omagh bombing and its aftermath, co-produced by Irish state broadcaster RTÉ and UK network Channel 4, and directed by Pete Travis. It was first shown on television in both countries in May, 2004.

Michael Gallagher, whose son Aiden (Paul Kelly) was killed in the bombing, is played by Gerard McSorley, originally from Omagh. Out of respect for the residents of the town, it was filmed on location in Navan, County Meath, Republic of Ireland. The film ends with the Julie Miller song Broken Things, which was performed by local singer Juliet Turner at the memorial for the victims of the Omagh bombing.

Reception
Rotten Tomatoes reported that 88% of critics gave the film positive reviews, with an average score of 7.2/10, however this is based upon a sample of only 8 reviews.

Critics particularly noted the gritty realism and powerful acting in the film. In his review, Scott Foundas of Variety said that it "serves as a companion piece to writer producer Paul Greengrass' superb 2001 pic Bloody Sunday, but emerges as a startlingly powerful achievement in its own right".

Awards 
The film won a number of awards. Most notably, it won the 2005 BAFTA TV Award for 'Best Single Drama'. It also won a 'Discovery Award' at the 2004 Toronto International Film Festival. At the Irish Film and Television Awards, the film won the awards for 'Best Irish Film' and 'Best Actor (Gerard McSorley)', and was nominated for a further five awards, including 'Best Film Director', 'Best Script' and 'Best Actress' for Michele Forbes.

External links
 Omagh from Channel 4
The Observer Day of death

Omagh (2004), Rotten Tomatoes
Review: Omagh, Variety

2004 films
Northern Irish films
Irish drama films
Irish television films
County Tyrone
Omagh
Films about The Troubles (Northern Ireland)
2004 drama films
Films directed by Pete Travis
2000s English-language films
2000s British films
British drama television films